Zana Fraillon (born 1981) is an Australian writer of fiction for children and young adults based in Melbourne, Australia. Fraillon is known for allowing young readers to examine human rights abuses within fiction and in 2017 she won an Amnesty CILIP Honour for her book The Bone Sparrow which highlights the plight of the Rohingya people. The Bone Sparrow has been translated to stage and is set to premier in the York Theatre Royal, York, UK, from 25 February 2022.

Biography 

Fraillon was born in Melbourne and spent her early childhood in San Francisco. She was an avid reader as a child and grew up surrounded by books. She attributes a vision problem that was not diagnosed until she was seven as the reason she was more focussed on books than the world around her. Fraillon studied history, spent a year teaching in China and returned to Melbourne to study and work as a teacher. Fraillon is from a family of writers and began writing fun picture books with her son. A friend encouraged her to submit these to a publisher and her writing career was born.

Bibliography 
 When No One's Looking At the Zoo Hardie Grant Egmont 2009
 When No One's Looking On the Farm Hardie Grant Egmont 2012
 Monstrum House Hardie Grant Egmont 2012
 No Stars to Wish On Allen & Unwin 2014
 The Bone Sparrow Lothian Children's Books 2016
 The Ones That Disappeared Hachette Children's Group 2017
 Wisp - A Story of Hope Lothian Children's Books 2018
 The Lost Soul Atlas Lothian Children's Books 2020
The Curiosities Lothian Children's Books 2021 
 The Way of Dog (UQP, 2022)
 The Raven's Song written with Bren MacDibble (Allen & Unwin, Aus/NZ, 2022) (Old Barn Books, UK, 2022)

Awards 
The Bone Sparrow
Winner of the Amnesty CILIP Honor Prize 2017
Winner of the ABIA Book of the Year for Older Children 2017
Winner of the Readings Young Adult Book Prize 2017
International Board on Books for Young People (IBBY) Australian Honour Book 2018
Children's Book Council of Australia (CBCA) Honour Book 2017 - Older Readers
Shortlisted in the Prime Minister's Literary Awards 2017
Shortlisted for a CILIP Carnegie Medal 2017
Shortlisted for the Victorian Premier's Literary Award 2017
Shortlisted in the Queensland Literary Awards 2017
Shortlisted in the Guardian Children's Fiction Prize 2016
Shortlisted in the Inky Awards 2017
The Ones that Disappeared
Winner of the NSW Premier's Literary Awards Ethel Turner Prize for Young People's Literature 2018
A Children's Book Council of Australia (CBCA) Notable Book 2018
Shortlisted in the Prime Minister's Literary Awards 2018
Nominated for the 2018 CILIP Carnegie Medal
Shortlisted for the UK CrimeFest Award - Best Crime Novel for Young Adults
Wisp
Longlisted in the 2020 Kate Greenaway Award
The Lost Soul Atlas
Nominated for the 2021 CILIP Carnegie Medal
Shortlisted for the 2021 CBCA Children's Book of the Year Award: Older Readers
Winner, 2020 Aurealis Award for best children's fiction

References 

1981 births
Living people
21st-century Australian writers